Elov Seger (June 6, 1940 – March 8, 1968) was a Canadian ice hockey defenseman who was an All-American and helped Michigan Tech win its first National Championship in 1962.

Career
Seger was a three-year player for the Huskies under head coach John MacInnes, helping the team reach the national championship game as a sophomore. After a down season, the Huskies roared to the top of their conference in 1962, winning 29 of their final 30 games, capturing both the conference and national championships. Seger was named to the All-WCHA Second Team and was selected as an All-American. The last goal he scored for the Huskies tied the game in the WCHA championship and began a 4-goal barrage in the third period.

After graduating, Seger continued his playing career, spending the next four seasons playing in the USHL (then a senior league), but his playing career was cut short when he was diagnosed with a brain tumor. Seger eventually succumbed to the disease in March 1968 but he was not forgotten by Michigan Tech. The program confers the Elov Seger Memorial Award to the player who has shown the greatest improvement. Seger was also inducted into the Michigan Tech Athletic Hall of Fame in 1998.

Career statistics

Regular season and playoffs

Awards and honors

References

External links

1940 births
1968 deaths
Deaths from brain tumor
Canadian ice hockey defencemen
Ice hockey people from Ontario
Sportspeople from Fort Frances
Michigan Tech Huskies men's ice hockey players
Waterloo Black Hawks players
Rochester Mustangs players
NCAA men's ice hockey national champions
AHCA Division I men's ice hockey All-Americans
Deaths from cancer in Canada
Neurological disease deaths in Canada